Richard Moore, MA  was Dean of Emly from 1818 until his death on 31 March 1818.

References

Irish Anglicans
People educated at Westminster School, London
Alumni of Trinity College, Cambridge
Deans of Emly
1818 deaths
Year of birth missing